Crackerjack 3 is a 2000 spy action about a group of retired Cold War spies, including an outgoing CIA operative (Bo Svenson), who are forced to work together to thwart a neutron bomb attack at an Economic Summit in Germany. It was written by Chris Hyde (Chained Heat II). The film is loosely related to its predecessors.

Plot
CIA agent Jack Thorn is ousted from his post by a corrupt replacement, Marcus Clay (Olivier Gruner) who is orchestrating an international incident in order to short sell the markets. This includes a bomb plot to coincide with a high-level UN meeting in Europe. Along with some old pals from the espionage world, Thorn and company spring into action, commandeer a jet, and then go undercover to try and prevent the terrorist attack.

Cast
 Bo Svenson as Jack Thorn
 Olivier Gruner as Marcus Clay
 Leo Rossi as Ricky Santeria-Ramos
 Amy Weber as Kelly Jones

Reception
Really Awful Movies cited this film as one of the Top 9 Good/Bad Movies by genre.

References

2000 films
2000s spy action films
American spy action films
Canadian spy films
Canadian action films
2000s English-language films
2000s American films
2000s Canadian films